The 1998 Texaco Grand Prix of Houston was the seventeenth round of the 1998 CART FedEx Champ Car World Series season, held on October 4, 1998, at a street adjacent to the George R. Brown Convention Center in Houston, Texas. The race was a rain-interrupted race, with the start being delayed 30 minutes due to heavy rain. Another heavy rainshower after 70 laps out of the scheduled 100 forced the race to be stopped, with the win handed to Dario Franchitti, who was leading at the time.

The race was the scene of an infamous Lap 48 collision between winner Franchitti and his Team KOOL Green teammate, Paul Tracy. While running second, Tracy attempted to pass Franchitti on the inside going into the left-handed Turn 6; however, Franchitti was already making the turn, leading to the teammates touching, and Tracy spinning, brushing the inside wall enough to bend his left front suspension, ending his race. This led to a terse conversation over the radio between Tracy and team owner Barry Green. When Tracy returned to pit road, he and Green nearly came to blows in plain view of television cameras and the crowd on the start-finish straight. Ironically, within days of their near fistfight, Tracy and Green agreed to a four-year contract extension.

Classification

Race

Caution flags

Lap Leaders

Point standings after race

References 

Texaco Grand Prix of Houston
Texaco Grand Prix of Houston
Texaco Grand Prix of Houston